HMS Northesk was an  which served in the Royal Navy during the First World War. The M class was an improvement on the previous , capable of higher speed. The vessel was launched in 1916 and joined the Grand Fleet. Northesk was involved in escorting convoys, including the first southbound convoy on the coastal route between Lerwick andImmingham in 1917. After the Armistice that marked the end of the First World War, the destroyer joined the Mediterranean Fleet and operated in the area around Sevastopol, including assisting in the evacuation of the Crimea in 1919. Soon afterwards, in 1921, Northesk was decommissioned and sold to be broken up.

Design and development

Northesk was one of twenty-two  destroyers ordered by the British Admiralty in November 1914 as part of the Third War Construction Programme. The M class was an improved version of the earlier  destroyers, designed to reach a higher speed in order to counter rumoured German fast destroyers, although it transpired these vessels did not exist.

Displacement was  normal and  full load. Three funnels were fitted.

Armament consisted of three single QF  Mk IV guns on the ship's centreline, with one on the forecastle, one aft on a raised platform and one between the middle and aft funnels. Torpedo armament consisted of two twin mounts for  torpedoes aft of the funnels. A single QF 2-pounder  "pom-pom" anti-aircraft gun was mounted between the torpedo tubes. Northesk was equipped with two depth charge chutes for anti-submarine warfare, the number of depth charges carried increasing as the war progressed. The ship had a complement of 80 officers and ratings.

Construction and career
Laid down by Palmers Shipbuilding and Iron Company of Hebburn, Northesk was launched on 5 July 1916 and completed during October that year. The destroyer was the only Royal Navy ship to be named after Rear Admiral William Carnegie, 7th Earl of Northesk, who fought at the Battle of Trafalgar. The vessel was deployed as part of the Grand Fleet, joining the Fifteenth Destroyer Flotilla at Scapa Flow.

Due to the continued German submarine threat, the destroyer was transferred to escort duties and, along with the R-class destroyer , was responsible for escorting the first southbound convoy to travel from Lerwick to Immingham on 29 April 1917. On 21 June, the destroyer was escorting a convoy of thirteen ships when the submarine  sank two merchant ships and escaped without harm. The vessel remained part of the Fifteenth Destroyer Flotilla in July 1917.

After the Armistice of 11 November 1918 and the end of the First World War, Northesk was transferred to the Mediterranean Fleet at Gibraltar. The Russian Civil War was raging and the United Kingdom decided to send units of the Royal Navy to the front line. Northesk was one of the ships chosen and sailed to Sevastopol, arriving on 23 November 1918. The destroyer subsequently returned on 28 April 1919 and helped with the evacuation of the Crimea. However, the posting did not last long. The destroyer returned to Britain, was decommissioned and, on 9 May 1921, sold to Thos. W. Ward to be broken up at Rainham, Kent.

Pennant numbers

References

Citations

Bibliography

 
 
 
 
 
 
 
 
 
 
 
 
 
 

1916 ships
Admiralty M-class destroyers
Ships built on the River Tyne
World War I destroyers of the United Kingdom